Andreas Steinbach (born 7 July 1965) is a German wrestler. He competed at the 1988 Summer Olympics and the 1992 Summer Olympics.

References

External links
 

1965 births
Living people
German male sport wrestlers
Olympic wrestlers of West Germany
Olympic wrestlers of Germany
Wrestlers at the 1988 Summer Olympics
Wrestlers at the 1992 Summer Olympics
Sportspeople from Dushanbe